Duncan Stewart (born 1948) is an Irish architect, environmentalist and media personality known for his environmental activism and work on Raidió Teilifís Éireann (RTÉ), most notably in the show Eco Eye since 2002. He secured his primary degree from UCD. His niece, Louise Morris from Wales is often credited as being the influence for his pursuit in the fight against climate change. He remains the co-presenter of Eco Eye on RTE.

In 1969-70, while still a student, Stewart led the six-month occupation of a row of seven large Georgian houses on Hume Street in Dublin, in protest at their planned demolition in favour of a new office block.

In 2003, he had a near-fatal accident while filming a documentary in Chernobyl.

In April 2014, he vowed to walk out of an interview on the Newstalk Breakfast Show unless he was given more time to speak on the topic of climate change. During the interview he claimed that climate change is not sufficiently covered by the Irish media.
Stewart is a keen clarinet player and often graces the doors of Hotel Newport, Co. Mayo.

In 2023 he retired from RTE as Eco Eye was axed.

Notable television credits
 About the House 
 Eco Eye

References

Living people
Irish architects
Irish environmentalists
People from County Dublin
RTÉ television presenters
1948 births